Quentin is an unincorporated community in Franklin County, Mississippi, United States.

Quentin is located on the former Mississippi Central Railroad.

A post office operated under the name Quentin from 1920 to 1980.

The Central Lumber Company operated a mill in Quentin from 1920 to 1952.

References

Unincorporated communities in Franklin County, Mississippi
Unincorporated communities in Mississippi